Sun British College (registered as Sun British Business Management College) is a private college in Vavuniya, Sri Lanka. It is recognized by the Association of Accounting Technicians of Sri Lanka.

Location 

It is located in the Northern Province in Sri Lanka. It is the only college conducts degree programmes for the students from war affected districts like Vavuniya, Mannar, Kilinochchi and Mullaitivu.

Faculties 
 Faculty of Linguistics
 Faculty of Education
 Faculty of Information & Communication Technology

External links 

 

Education in Vavuniya
Universities and colleges in Northern Province, Sri Lanka
2007 establishments in Sri Lanka
Educational institutions established in 2007